is a subway station on the  Fukuoka City Subway Nanakuma Line in Sawara-ku, Fukuoka in Japan. Its station symbol is a firefly in blue, representing the nearby Muromi river.

Lines

Platforms

Vicinity
 Fukuoka College of Health Sciences
 Fukuoka Dental College
 Roman bathhouse
 Starbucks
 Super Hallo Day Store
 Tsutaya (Culture Convenience Club Co.)

History
February 3, 2005: Opening of the station

References

Railway stations in Japan opened in 2005
Railway stations in Fukuoka Prefecture
Nanakuma Line